Rob Kimmons (born January 30, 1981) is a retired American mixed martial artist who last competed in the Welterweight division. A professional from 2000 until 2013, he competed for the UFC, WEC, and Titan FC.

Background
Raised in the small town of Rosedale, Kansas, Kimmons wrestled his junior and senior seasons of high school, earning first team all-state honors his senior year.

Mixed martial arts career
After compiling an amateur MMA record of 16-0, Kimmons made his professional mixed martial arts debut on November 21, 2003 for the HOOKnSHOOT promotion. He knocked out David Webster in the first round to notch his first professional win. Rob won two more times in 2004 and was signed to World Extreme Cagefighting and was given a fight against Joe Riggs for the vacant middleweight title. Kimmons lost the fight in the first round. After winning six straight fights since the loss to Riggs, Kimmons took his second loss this time to Ryan Jensen.

Kimmons fought for the World Series of Rumble Welterweight title in 2006 and defeated Steve Schneider to become champion. He then fought in Shooto's American Welterweight Grand Prix where he defeated all competition with first-round knockouts or submissions to win the 16 man tournament.

In July 2007, Kimmons faced UFC veteran, Marvin Eastman for the International Fighting Organization's middleweight title. Kimmons lost the fight by decision. Kimmons then dropped down to the welterweight division two months later in order to face Tristan Yunker for the IFO's welterweight title. Kimmons won the title in the first round.

Ultimate Fighting Championship
Kimmons made his debut defeating Rob Yundt on the undercard of TUF 7 Finale. Kimmons submitted Yundt with a guillotine choke in round 1.

He had his second fight for the company on the UFC Fight Night 15 card taking on Dan Miller. Miller dominated the fight and submitted Kimmons early in round one. Kimmons bounced back with a win on the UFC Fight Night 18 card by choking Joe Vedepo unconscious. Kimmons won submission of the night honors.

After suffering a TKO loss to Jorge Rivera, Kimmons plans to move to the UFC welterweight division instead of middleweight.

Kimmons was scheduled to face Mike Pierce on March 21, 2010 at UFC Live: Vera vs. Jones, but Kimmons was forced off the card with an injury.  Pierce is now set to face UFC newcomer Julio Paulino.

Kimmons then faced Steve Steinbeiss on August 1, 2010 at UFC on Versus 2 and won via unanimous decision.

Kimmons lost to Kyle Noke on November 13, 2010 at UFC 122 via submission (rear-naked choke) at 1:33 of round 2.

Kimmons next faced Dongi Yang on March 3, 2011 at UFC Live: Sanchez vs. Kampmann.  He lost the fight via TKO due to punches near the end of the second round and was subsequently released from the promotion.

Post UFC
He faced Chuck Parmelee on September, 10th 2011 winning the fight in 53 seconds via Guillotine Choke.

He faced Andre Kase on October, 6th 2012 winning the fight 3:14 in the first round via TKO due to Knees.

He faced Dan McGlasson on November, 17th 2012 winning the fight via Submission due to strikes.

Championships and accomplishments
International Fighting Organization
IFO Welterweight Championship (One time)
Ultimate Fighting Championship
Submission of the Night (One time)  vs. Joe Vedepo (technical guillotine choke)

Mixed martial arts record

|-
| Loss
| align=center| 25–9
| Tyler Stinson
| TKO (punches)
| Epic Fight Night 1: Stinson vs. Kimmons
| 
| align=center| 1
| align=center| 0:54
| Kansas City, Missouri, United States
| 
|-
| Win
| align=center| 25–8
| Jake Bramstone
| TKO (submission to punches)
| Tommy Tran Promotions
| 
| align=center| 1
| align=center| 3:25
| Branson, Missouri, United States
|Return to Welterweight.
|-
| Win
| align=center| 24–8
| Chuck Parmelee
| Submission (guillotine choke)
| Shark Fights 19
| 
| align=center| 1
| align=center| 0:53
| Independence, Missouri, United States
|Catchweight (174 lbs) bout.
|-
| Loss
| align=center| 23–8
| Brendan Seguin
| Decision (unanimous)
| Titan FC 19
| 
| align=center| 3
| align=center| 5:00
| Kansas City, Kansas, United States
| 
|-
| Loss
| align=center| 23–7
| Yang Dongi
| TKO (punches)
| UFC Live: Sanchez vs. Kampmann
| 
| align=center| 2
| align=center| 4:47
| Louisville, Kentucky, United States
| 
|-
| Loss
| align=center| 23–6
| Kyle Noke
| Submission (rear-naked choke)
| UFC 122
| 
| align=center| 2
| align=center| 1:33
| Oberhausen, Germany
| 
|-
| Win
| align=center| 23–5
| Steve Steinbeiss
| Decision (unanimous)
| UFC Live: Jones vs. Matyushenko
| 
| align=center| 3
| align=center| 5:00
| San Diego, California, United States
| 
|-
| Loss
| align=center| 22–5
| Jorge Rivera
| TKO (punches)
| UFC 104
| 
| align=center| 3
| align=center| 1:53
| Los Angeles, California, United States
| 
|-
| Win
| align=center| 22–4
| Joe Vedepo
| Technical Submission (guillotine choke)
| UFC Fight Night: Condit vs. Kampmann
| 
| align=center| 1
| align=center| 1:54
| Nashville, Tennessee, United States
| 
|-
| Loss
| align=center| 21–4
| Dan Miller
| Submission (rear-naked choke)
| UFC Fight Night: Diaz vs. Neer
| 
| align=center| 1
| align=center| 1:27
| Omaha, Nebraska, United States
| 
|-
| Win
| align=center| 21–3
| Rob Yundt
| Submission (guillotine choke)
| The Ultimate Fighter: Team Rampage vs Team Forrest Finale
| 
| align=center| 1
| align=center| 3:58
| Las Vegas, Nevada, United States
|Return to Middleweight.
|-
| Win
| align=center| 20–3
| Ryan Sheeper
| Submission
| World Cage FC
| 
| align=center| 1
| align=center| 1:36
| Missouri, United States
| 
|-
| Win
| align=center| 19–3
| Fernando Rivera
| Submission
| Titan FC 11
| 
| align=center| 1
| align=center| 1:10
| Kansas City, Missouri, United States
| 
|-
| Win
| align=center| 18–3
| Tristan Yunker
| Submission (rear-naked choke)
| International Fighting Organization: Kimmons vs. Yunker
| 
| align=center| 1
| align=center| 2:55
| Las Vegas, Nevada, United States
| 
|-
| Loss
| align=center| 17–3
| Marvin Eastman
| Decision (unanimous)
| International Fighting Organization: Eastman vs. Kimmons
| 
| align=center| 5
| align=center| 5:00
| Las Vegas, Nevada, United States
| 
|-
| Win
| align=center| 17–2
| Curt Bee
| TKO
| American Bushido: 2007 GP Final
| 
| align=center| 1
| align=center| 1:53
| McCook, Illinois, United States
| 
|-
| Win
| align=center| 16–2
| Joe Enright
| Submission (guillotine choke)
| American Bushido: 2007 GP Semifinals
| 
| align=center| 1
| align=center| 2:21
| McCook, Illinois, United States
| 
|-
| Win
| align=center| 15–2
| Jasper Mayfield
| Submission (rear-naked choke)
| Titan FC 7
| 
| align=center| 1
| align=center| 1:43
| Kansas City, Kansas, United States
| 
|-
| Win
| align=center| 14–2
| Josh Lee
| Submission (triangle choke)
| American Bushido: 07 GP Quarterfinals
| 
| align=center| 1
| align=center| 1:46
| McCook, Illinois, United States
| 
|-
| Win
| align=center| 13–2
| Charlie Kropf
| Submission (guillotine choke)
| Titan FC 6
| 
| align=center| 1
| align=center| 1:50
| Kansas City, Kansas, United States
| 
|-
| Win
| align=center| 12–2
| Steve Schneider
| Decision (unanimous)
| World Series of Rumble
| 
| align=center| 3
| align=center| 5:00
| Kansas, United States
| 
|-
| Win
| align=center| 11–2
| Sean Huffman
| Submission (rear-naked choke)
| Titan FC 5
| 
| align=center| 1
| align=center| 0:47
| Kansas City, Kansas, United States
| 
|-
| Win
| align=center| 10–2
| Mike Van Meer 
| Submission (guillotine choke)
| Titan FC 4
| 
| align=center| 1
| align=center| 3:35
| Kansas City, Kansas, United States
| 
|-
| Loss
| align=center| 9–2
| Ryan Jensen
| Submission (choke)
| Victory FC 14: Aggression
| 
| align=center| 1
| align=center| N/A
| United States
| 
|-
| Win
| align=center| 9–1
| Mike Van Meer
| TKO (submission to punches)
| Midwest Cage Championship 2: Midwest Xplosion
| 
| align=center| 2
| align=center| 1:56
| Des Moines, Iowa, United States
| 
|-
| Win
| align=center| 8–1
| Kenny Stevens
| Decision (unanimous)
| Titan FC 1
| 
| align=center| 3
| align=center| 5:00
| Kansas City, Kansas, United States
| 
|-
| Win
| align=center| 7–1
| Darin Brudigan
| Decision (unanimous)
| Victory FC 12: Warpath
| 
| align=center| 3
| align=center| 5:00
| Council Bluffs, Iowa, United States
| 
|-
| Win
| align=center| 6–1
| Brian Green
| KO (punch)
| Midwest Cage Championship 1: In the Beginning
| 
| align=center| 1
| align=center| 0:50
| Des Moines, Iowa, United States
| 
|-
| Win
| align=center| 5–1
| Dan Rau
| Submission (guillotine choke)
| Victory FC 11: Demolition
| 
| align=center| 1
| align=center| 2:15
| Council Bluffs, Iowa, United States
| 
|-
| Win
| align=center| 4–1
| James Wade
| TKO (punches)
| Shooto: Battle at the Ballpark
| 
| align=center| 1
| align=center| 2:20
| St. Louis, Missouri, United States
| 
|-
| Loss
| align=center| 3–1
| Joe Riggs
| TKO (submission to punches)
| WEC 15
| 
| align=center| 1
| align=center| 1:24
| Lemoore, California, United States
| For the vacant WEC Middleweight Championship.
|-
| Win
| align=center| 3–0
| Chad Sullivan
| TKO
| International Sport Combat Federation: Clash of the Titans
| 
| align=center| 1
| align=center| 0:27
| Kansas City, Missouri, United States
| 
|-
| Win
| align=center| 2–0
| Jason Purcell
| Submission (rear-naked choke)
| Victory FC 7: Showdown
| 
| align=center| 1
| align=center| N/A
| Council Bluffs, Iowa, United States
| 
|-
| Win
| align=center| 1–0
| David Webster
| KO
| HOOKnSHOOT: Kansas City
| 
| align=center| 1
| align=center| N/A
| Kansas City, Missouri, United States
|

Amateur mixed martial arts record

|Win
|align=center| 7–0
|Cameron Smith
|Submission 
|Adrenaline Extreme Combat 5: War in the Cage 5
|
|align=center| 1
|align=center| 3:10
|Kansas City, Kansas, United States
|
|-
|Win
|align=center| 6–0
|Tommy Eblen
|TKO 
|Adrenaline Extreme Combat 4
|
|align=center| 2
|align=center| 2:10
|Kansas City, Missouri, United States
|
|-
|Win
|align=center| 5–0
|Nathan Frampton
|Submission 
|KO Fight Night Promotions: Beaumont Brawl 2
|
|align=center| 1
|align=center| N/A
|Kansas City, Missouri, United States
|
|-
|Win
|align=center| 4–0
|Chris Henning
|TKO
|KO Fight Night Promotions: Blood and Sweat
|
|align=center| 1
|align=center| N/A
|Blue Springs, Missouri, United States
|
|-
|Win
|align=center| 3–0
|Aaron Bollig
|TKO
|International Sport Combat Federation: Cowtown Rumble 3
|
|align=center| 1
|align=center| N/A
|Kansas City, Kansas, United States
|
|-
|Win
|align=center| 2–0
|Josh Hargis
|Submission (punches)
|International Sport Combat Federation: Cowtown Rumble 2
|
|align=center| 2
|align=center| N/A
|Independence, Missouri, United States
|
|-
|Win
|align=center| 1–0
|Mike Searcy
|TKO 
|International Sport Combat Federation: Cowtown Rumble 1
|
|align=center| 1
|align=center| 0:09
|Independence, Missouri, United States
|

See also
List of male mixed martial artists

References

External links
 
 

American male mixed martial artists
Mixed martial artists from Missouri
Middleweight mixed martial artists
Living people
1981 births
Sportspeople from Kansas City, Missouri
Light heavyweight mixed martial artists
Welterweight mixed martial artists
Mixed martial artists utilizing jujutsu
Mixed martial artists utilizing Brazilian jiu-jitsu
People from Gladstone, Missouri
Ultimate Fighting Championship male fighters
American practitioners of Brazilian jiu-jitsu
American jujutsuka